The British Sequence Championships are ballroom dancing championships for adults and children held annually in Blackpool, England.

The championships for adults take place as part of the Blackpool Sequence Dance Festival and have been running since 1949. They are held in the Empress Ballroom at the Winter Gardens in Blackpool. Dancers compete in up to five sequence dances determined by the organiser each year for the titles. The British Championship is seen as the highlight of the year, not only because it is "one of the country's most prestigious titles", but also due to the grandeur of the location.

The Blackpool Sequence Dance Festival incorporates a popular competition day for children on the Saturday, followed by inventive competitions for professionals and the British Sequence Championships for Professional, Amateur Classical Sequence (previously "Old Time"), Amateur Modern Sequence, Senior Classical Sequence and Under 21s Classical Sequence. The championship events are granted by the British Dance Council and are run under their rules. The festival celebrated its 60th year in 2009.

Entrants to the Championships predominantly come from Great Britain, although many Irish dance schools have attended the festival over the years. Entrants have also come from as far away as Japan and Australia.

The British Sequence Championships for children takes place as part of the Blackpool Junior Dance Festival, running since 1947. They start on Easter Monday each year and run for a week. Until 2010, when increasing numbers prompted a move to the Empress Ballroom, they had been held at the Tower Ballroom in Blackpool Tower. The events incorporate the Juvenile Classical Sequence Championship, the Junior Classical Sequence Championship and the Junior Modern Sequence Championship.

Famous entrants to the championships include a young Cheryl Cole and former World Amateur Ballroom Champion Jonathon Crossley with partner Kylie Jones.

British Amateur Sequence Champions

British Under 21s, Professional and Senior Sequence Champions

Juvenile and Junior British Champions

References

External links
 Blackpool Dance Festival Website
 British Dance Council Website
 English Amateur Dancing Association
 Sequence Dancing World

Dancesport competitions
Dance in the United Kingdom
Ballroom dance competitions
Competitions in the United Kingdom
1949 establishments in the United Kingdom
Recurring events established in 1949
Annual events in the United Kingdom
National championships in the United Kingdom